Somatidia ptinoides is a species of beetle in the family Cerambycidae. It was described by Henry Walter Bates in 1874.

Varietas
 Somatidia ptinoides var. rubella Broun, 1914
 Somatidia ptinoides var. heterarthra Broun, 1909

References

ptinoides
Beetles described in 1874